The Tempest was a sailing event on the Sailing at the 1972 Summer Olympics program in Kiel-Schilksee. Seven races were scheduled and completed. 42 sailors, on 21 boats, from 21 nation competed.

Race schedule
Due to the interruption of the Games on 6 September 1972, the race was postponed till 7 September. Then the race conditions were unsuitable. Heavy fog and poor wind conditions made it not possible to race until 8 September. Also the medal ceremony was also postponed until 8 September.

Course area and course configuration 
For the Tempest course area B(ravo) was used. The location (54°30'30'’N, 10°13'00'’E) points to the center of the 2 nm radius circle. The distance between mark 1 and 3 was about 2nm.

Final results 
These are the results of the Tempest event.

Daily standings

Further reading

References 

Tempest
Tempest (keelboat)